Countess Marie von Ebner-Eschenbach (13 September 183012 March 1916) was an Austrian writer. Noted for her psychological novels, she is regarded as one of the most important German-language writers of the latter portion of the 19th century.

Biography

Early life and family
She was born at the castle of the Dubský von Třebomyslice family in Zdislawitz near Kroměříž in Moravia (present Zdislavice in the Czech Republic), the daughter of Baron (from 1843: Count) Franz Joseph Dubsky von Trebomyslicz, a nobleman whose family roots are deeply Catholic and Bohemian, and his wife Maria Rosalia Therese, née Baroness von Vockel, who came from a noble Protestant-Saxon background. Marie lost her mother in early infancy, but received a careful intellectual training from two stepmothers, first Baroness Eugenie von Bartenstein, and then her second step-mother, Countess Xaverine von Kolowrat-Krakowsky, who often contributed to her inspiration by taking her to the Burgtheater (town theater, citizen's theater) from time to time in Vienna. Despite being part of a noble family having access to her family's vast libraries, she was never actually formally schooled. However, because of her curiosity, access to information, and educated family, she became auto-didact at a young age, and was taught fluent French, German, and Czech. In 1848 she married her cousin, Moritz von Ebner-Eschenbach, a physics and chemistry professor at a Viennese engineering academy. Later on, he would become an Austrian captain, and promoted to lieutenant field marshal on his retirement. The couple resided first in Vienna, then, from 1850, at Louka (Klosterbruck) near Znojmo, as the engineering academy had been relocated there, and after 1860 again in Vienna. The marriage was childless to disappointment of both of them. Marie grappled with the domestic tasks. She kept a journal and wrote letters explaining how she felt unsatisfied. It has been speculated that Marie may have suffered from "hysteria" including debilitating headaches and excessive nervousness.

Career and success

Marie began devoting herself to literary work. In her endeavours she received assistance and encouragement from Franz Grillparzer and Freiherr von Münch-Bellinghausen. Her first publicized work was the drama Maria Stuart in Scotland, which Philipp Eduard Devrient produced at the Karlsruhe theatre in 1860. Then came a tragedy in five acts, Marie Roland, with several one-act dramas: Doktor Ritter, Violets, and The Disconsolate One. Though she was encouraged to keep writing, her relative failure in the field of playwriting had actually become somewhat of a point of an embarrassment to her family.

After these limited successes in the field of drama, she turned to narrative. Commencing with Die Prinzessin von Banalien (1872), she graphically depicts in Božena (Stuttgart, 1876, 4th ed. 1899) and Das Gemeindekind (Berlin, 1887, 4th ed. 1900) the surroundings of her Moravian home, and in Lotti, die Uhrmacherin (Berlin, 1883, 4th ed. 1900), Zwei Comtessen (Berlin, 1885, 5th ed. 1898), Unsühnbar (1890, 5th ed. 1900) and Glaubenslos? (1893) the life of the Austrian aristocracy in town and country.

Much of Ebner-Eschenbach's more mainstream success is accredited to Julius Rodenberg due to his publishing Ebner-Eschenbach's work in his popular periodical, Die Deutsche Rundschau. In 1875, her half-sister, composer Julie Waldburg-Wurzach, used her social contacts at Cotta Verlag (today Klett-Cotta Verlag) to market some of Ebner-Eschenbach's work. Ebner-Eschenbach also published Neue Erzählungen (Berlin, 1881, 3rd ed. 1894), Aphorismen (Berlin, 1880, 4th ed. 1895) and Parabeln, Märchen und Gedichte (2nd ed., Berlin, 1892). Von Ebner-Eschenbach's elegance of style, her incisive wit and masterly depiction of character give her a foremost place among the German women writers of her time. On the occasion of her 70th birthday the University of Vienna conferred upon her the degree of doctor of philosophy, honoris causa. An edition of Marie von Ebner-Eschenbach's Gesammelte Schriften (Collected Works) began to appear in 1893 (Berlin).

Throughout her life, she had never created literature or plays for monetary reasons, and so, in her will, she left, as to aid other writers in their own endeavors, the compensation she had received. She died in Vienna, Austria-Hungary.

The Marie Ebner-Eschenbach park in Währing, Vienna, is named after her.

Works 
 Aus Franzensbad. 6 Episteln von keinem Propheten (6 epistles from no prophet). Leipzig: Lorck, 1858
 Maria Stuart in Schottland. Drama in five acts. Vienna: Ludwig Mayer, 1860
 Das Veilchen (The Violet). Comedy in one act. Vienna: Wallishausser, 1861
 Marie Roland. Tragedy in five acts. Vienna: Wallishausser, 1867
 Doktor Ritter. Dramatic poem in one act. Vienna: Jasper, 1869
 Die Prinzessin von Banalien. A fairy tale. Vienna: Rosner, 1872
 Das Waldfräulein (Maid of the woods), 1873
 Božena. A story. Stuttgart: Cotta, 1876
 Die Freiherren von Gemperlein, 1878
 Lotti, die Uhrmacherin (Lotti, the clock maker), in: Deutsche Rundschau, 1880
 Aphorismen. Berlin: Franz Ebhardt, 1880
 Dorf- und Schloßgeschichten (Village and castle stories), 1883 (containing Der Kreisphysikus, Jacob Szela, Krambambuli, Die Resel, Die Poesie des Unbewußten)
 Zwei Comtessen (Two countesses). A story. Berlin: Franz Ebhardt, 1885
 Neue Dorf- und Schloßgeschichten (New village and castle stories). Stories. Berlin: Paetel, 1886 (containing Die Unverstandene auf dem Dorfe, Er laßt die Hand küssen, Der gute Mond)
 Das Gemeindekind (Child of the neighborhood) Novel. 1887
 Unsühnbar. A story. Berlin: Paetel, 1890
 Drei Novellen (Three novellas). 1892 (containing Oversberg)
 Glaubenslos? A story. Berlin: Paetel, 1893
 Das Schädliche. Die Totenwacht. Two stories. Berlin: Paetel, 1894
 Rittmeister Brand. Bertram Vogelweid. Two stories. Berlin: Paetel, 1896
 Alte Schule (Old school) A story. Berlin: Paetel, 1897 (containing Ein Verbot, Der Fink, Eine Vision, Schattenleben, Verschollen)
 Am Ende. Scene in one act. Berlin: Bloch, 1897
 Aus Spätherbsttagen. Stories. Berlin: Paetel, 1901 (containing Der Vorzugsschüler, Maslans Frau, Fräulein Susannens Weihnachtsabend, Uneröffnet zu verbrennen, Die Reisegefährten, Die Spitzin, In letzter Stunde, Ein Original, Die Visite)
 Agave. Novel. Berlin: Paetel, 1903
 Die unbesiegbare Macht. Two stories. Berlin: Paetel, 1905
 Meine Kinderjahre (My childhood years). Autobiographical sketches. Berlin: Paetel, 1906
 Altweibersommer. Berlin: Paetel, 1909

Notes

References
 
  This work in turn cites:
 A. Bettelheim, Marie von Ebner-Eschenbach: Biographische Blätter (Berlin, 1900)
 M. Necker, Marie von Ebner-Eschenbach, nach ihren Werken geschildert (Berlin, 1900)

External links 

 
 
 
 Biography by the Austrian encyclopedia
 Biography by the German historical Museum (in German)
 

1830 births
1916 deaths
People from Kroměříž District
People from the Margraviate of Moravia
Moravian-German people
Austrian baronesses
German-language writers
Aphorists
19th-century Austrian women writers
Austrian women novelists
Austrian women short story writers
Austrian essayists
19th-century Austrian novelists
20th-century Austrian novelists
20th-century Austrian women writers
19th-century short story writers
20th-century short story writers
19th-century essayists
20th-century essayists